Greg Mangano (born October 28, 1989) is an American basketball player for KTP Basket of Korisliiga. He played college basketball for the Yale Bulldogs. He is known for versatility as a frontcourt player and his polished face up game offensively.

High school
Mangano attended Notre-Dame West Haven, where he was a two-time all-state player and a two-time all-league selection. His senior year was his best year, as he averaged 26 points, 15 rebounds, and 6 blocks per game. These numbers were good enough to get him MVP honors and a nomination for the McDonald's All-American Game. Rivals.com ranked Mahimgnano as a 2-star prospect.

College

Freshman year 
Mangano received the John C. Cobb Award for the best freshman player on the Yale team as the Bulldogs went 13–15. He received little playing time, averaging just 6.5 minutes per game, although he did manage to score 2.1 points per game.

Sophomore year 
Mangano was given a bigger role in his sophomore year. He hit the weight room hard over the summer following his freshman year. His playing time tripled, and he led the Ivy League in blocks with 2 per game. He also added 7.5 points and 5.5 rebounds per game. Despite his success, Yale struggled, going 12–19.

Junior year 
Mangano had a breakout season his junior year, averaging a double-double for the Bulldogs with 16.3 points per game and 10 rebounds per game, along with 3 blocks per game. His 85 blocks were a Yale record, and the third-highest total in Ivy League history. As well as finishing second in scoring, Mangano led the Ivy League in blocks and rebounding; his totals were good for 9th and 24th in the nation respectively. His play was good enough to warrant selection to the All-Ivy first team and the National Association of Basketball Coaches All-district first team.  Mangano declared for the 2011 NBA draft, but withdrew his name before the deadline. Yale had some success, finishing the year with a 15–13 record.

Senior year 
Mangano came into his senior year considered a strong contender for Ivy League Player of the Year. The Bulldogs had early success and impressed in many of their games against stronger opposition. Mangano was particularly impressive against the then-10th ranked Florida Gators, scoring 26 points, grabbing 12 rebounds, blocking two shots, and making 4 of the 6 three-pointers that he attempted. The Bulldogs had an outside chance to claim the Ivy League title entering their final 3 games, but losses to Princeton and Penn prevented the Bulldogs from claiming the title. The loss to the Penn Quakers was likely due to Mangano being the target of heckling by the Penn Band. Mangano's statistical numbers were very similar to those in his junior year. He led the Ivy League in rebounds and blocks, averaging 9.7 and 2.2 per game respectively. He was also sixth in the Ivy League in scoring with 18.2 points per game. He was named to the All-Ivy First Team. In terms of team success, Mangano's senior year was his best at Yale, as the Bulldogs went 19-10 and qualified for the CollegeInsider.com Tournament, where the team lost in the first round to the Rakim Sanders-led Fairfield Stags 68–56. Mangano had 17 points and 8 rebounds.

Mangano helped bring Yale back to relevance in the Ivy League after years at the bottom of the league. He finished his career with 213 blocks, which is most in Yale history- more than former NBA player Chris Dudley- and the third most in Ivy League history. Mangano was also sixth in school history in rebounds and 13th in points.

Professional career 
Mangano was honored as one of the nation's best seniors when he was selected to participate in the prestigious Portsmouth Invitational Tournament. His best game was his second; he scored 13 points on 5–11 shooting, including 3 of 5 from three, and grabbed 9 boards. he started and played 26 minutes. Mangano averaged 10.7 points, 6 rebounds, and 1 block per game while shooting 46.2 percent from three-point range, which was the sixth best percentage in the tournament. Despite working out with many teams, Mangano went undrafted in the 2012 NBA Draft, although according to his agent Mangano would have been picked if he had been European. Mangano said that this shows that, "the NBA still doesn't respect the level of play in the Ivy League."

After going undrafted, Mangano signed with Antalya BB in the Turkish Basketball League On 29 December 2012, he left Turkey to join Força Lleida in the LEB Oro, Spain's second division.  In 2013, Mangano signed with ratiopharm Ulm in Germany.

On August 12, 2018, Mangano signed with the Ukrainian team Kyiv-Basket. He chose the jersey number 44. He spent the 2019-20 season with Bambitious Nara of B.League, averaging 21.6 points and 15.1 rebounds per game. On August 29, 2020, Mangano signed with KTP Basket of Korisliiga.

USA Basketball 
Mangano's play led him to try out for the USA World University Games Team in 2008. He made the team, and appeared in 6 of the team's 8 games. He averaged 3.2 points and 3.2 rebounds per game, while averaging 11.3 minutes per game. He was second on the team with 5 blocks. The US went 7–1, good for 5th place.

References

External links
Yale athletic profile
USA Basketball profile

1989 births
Living people
American expatriate basketball people in Belgium
American expatriate basketball people in Finland
American expatriate basketball people in Germany
American expatriate basketball people in Japan
American expatriate basketball people in Saudi Arabia
American expatriate basketball people in Spain
American expatriate basketball people in Turkey
American expatriate basketball people in Ukraine
American men's basketball players
Antalya Büyükşehir Belediyesi players
Bambitious Nara players
Basketball players from Connecticut
BC Kyiv players
Centers (basketball)
Força Lleida CE players
Kangoeroes Basket Mechelen players
Kauhajoen Karhu players
People from Orange, Connecticut
Power forwards (basketball)
Ratiopharm Ulm players
Sendai 89ers players
Sportspeople from New Haven County, Connecticut
Yale Bulldogs men's basketball players
Al Nassr BC players